A Committee of the States was an arm of the United States government under the Articles of Confederation and Perpetual Union. The committee consisted of one member from each state and was designed to carry out the functions of government while the Congress of the Confederation was in recess.

The committee was in effect for only one year, 1784, and never achieved a quorum.

History
In the draft of the Articles of Confederation by John Dickinson and the draft committee, this committee was called the Council of State, vested with executive and staff control for commerce, trade, education and issues as delegated by Congress. A minimum of nine of the thirteen states would have had to vote in favor of delegating any new powers to the council, a model after the various administrative committees set up during the American Revolutionary War. Instead, the Second Continental Congress changed it to Committee of the States, with limited management powers only when Congress was not in session.

The committee was set up in 1784 on the proposal of Thomas Jefferson, then a congressman from Virginia. The committee "quarrelled very soon, split into two parties, [and] abandoned their post."  This was the only time that the committee was formed, and never had a quorum to carry out its administrative tasks.

Powers
The congressional powers that did not require nine votes were:
Oversee foreign affairs
Appoint and receive ambassadors
Rules of prize 
Create and appointing high sea courts
Establish post roads and offices
Fix postage rates
Appoint general military officers
Establish military rules and regulations
Chose a president of the Congress
Establishing standards of weights and measures 
Indian trade and affairs regulation

References

Continental Congress
1784 establishments in the United States
1784 disestablishments in the United States